Helen S. Lang (February 19, 1947 – June 20, 2016) was an American philosophy professor and researcher, specializing in ancient Greek philosophy and science, medieval and Renaissance thought, and an expert on Aristotelian natural philosophy.

For over twenty years she was with Trinity College, Hartford (1978–2003), where she was the Koeppel Professor of Classical Studies (named in 2001). Her last affiliation was with Villanova University, Pennsylvania, where she was Chair of Philosophy Department (2002–2005) and a department member at the time of her death.

As a scholar, Helen S. Lang was a fellow at the Dibner Institute for the History of Science and Technology at MIT and at the Institute for Advanced Study in Princeton, New Jersey.

Publications
Helen Lang wrote over three dozen articles and multiple book reviews.

Major works
1992: Aristotle's Physics and Its Medieval Varieties
1998: The Order of Nature in Aristotle's Physics
2001: (together with A.D. Macro and Jon McGinnis) an edition and translation of Proclus's De Aeternitate Mundi ("On the eternity of the world")
2015: (essay) "Plato on Divine Art and the Production of Body," (in B. Holmes and D.-K. Fischer, ed. The Frontiers of Ancient Science: Essays in Honor of Heinrich von Staden
2017: (essay)  "Embodied or Ensouled? Aristotle on the Relation of Soul and Body," (in J. E. H. Smith, ed. Embodiment [Oxford University Press, forthcoming, 2017]

References

1947 births
2016 deaths
American philosophy academics
American women philosophers
Jewish American academics 
Presidents of the Society for Medieval and Renaissance Philosophy
University of Colorado alumni
University of Toronto alumni
University of Colorado faculty
University of Denver faculty
State University of New York faculty
University of Pennsylvania faculty
Trinity College (Connecticut) faculty
Villanova University faculty
Deaths from brain tumor 
21st-century American Jews
21st-century American women